Susan Mehmedbasich-Wright (born September 16, 1957) is an American former professional tennis player.

Mehmedbasich, raised in Northern California, competed briefly on tour after turning professional at the age of 17. Her career included a win over Wendy Turnbull and she made the women's doubles third round of the 1976 Wimbledon Championships.

References

External links
 
 

1957 births
Living people
American female tennis players
Tennis people from California